Vladimir González Martínez (born October 16, 1978) is a male road cyclist from Colombia.

Career

2001
 3rd in  National Championships, Road, ITT, Elite, Colombia (COL)
2003
 1st in Clasica Independencia Ciudad de Flandes (COL)
2005
 1st in Stage 6 Vuelta a Colombia, Santa Rosa Cabal (COL)

References
 

1978 births
Living people
Colombian male cyclists
Vuelta a Colombia stage winners
Place of birth missing (living people)
21st-century Colombian people